Claytonville may refer to the following places in the United States:

Claytonville, Illinois, an unincorporated community in Iroquois County
Claytonville, Virginia, an unincorporated community in Clarke County